Ida Benedetto may refer to:
 Ida Di Benedetto, Italian actress and film producer
 Ida Benedetto, immersive artist